Hermus is the name of several figures in Greek mythology.

Hermus or Hermos may also refer to:
Hermus or Hermos, ancient name of the Gediz River, now in Turkey
Hermus (Attica), an ancient town of Attica, Greece
Hermus (surname), several people